Hwang Eun-bi (born June 3, 1998), better known by her stage name SinB, is a South Korean singer, dancer and actress. She is known for being a former member of South Korean girl group GFriend and a current member of the trio Viviz.

Early life
SinB was born June 3, 1998, in Cheongju. In 2017, she graduated from School of Performing Arts Seoul.

Prior to her debut, she trained with Big Hit Entertainment for 2 years, then later moved onto LOEN Entertainment, where she trained for an additional year before settling with Source Music.

Career

2015–2021: Debut with GFriend

On January 15, 2015, SinB debuted as a member of South Korean girl group GFriend with the release of their debut album Season of Glass. On August 26, 2016, SinB released "Confession" (고백) for the soundtrack of Cinderella with Four Knights.

In 2018, SinB along with Red Velvet's Seulgi, (G)I-dle's Soyeon and soloist Chungha released "Wow Thing" on September 28 as part of SM Entertainment's project album SM Station X 0.

2021–present: Debut with Viviz
On October 6, 2021, it was announced that SinB, along with former GFriend members, Eunha and Umji, had signed a contract with BPM Entertainment to debut as a trio. On October 8, 2021, it was announced the group name would be Viviz.

In December 2021, it was announced that SinB will appear as an MC on the new beauty and style program Style Me Season 2 which will air on Dong-A TV for the first time on January 9, 2022.

Viviz debuted on February 9, 2022, with the extended play Beam of Prism.

Discography

Collaborations

Soundtrack appearances

Composition credits
All song credits are adapted from the Korea Music Copyright Association's database unless stated otherwise.

Filmography

Television show

Television series

Awards and nominations

Notes

References

External links

 

Living people
1998 births
People from Cheongju
GFriend members
Viviz members
K-pop singers
School of Performing Arts Seoul alumni
South Korean women pop singers
South Korean female idols
21st-century South Korean singers
21st-century South Korean women singers
21st-century South Korean actresses
South Korean television personalities
BPM Entertainment artists
Hybe Corporation artists